Fixin is a commune in the Côte-d'Or department in the Bourgogne region on the Grand Crus route in eastern France. The French archaeologist Roland Martin (1912–1997) died in Fixin.

Wine

Fixin is one of the wine communes of Côte de Nuits.

Administration

Population

Sights
 Fixey Church (built 10th & 12th century) stands in the middle of the vineyards, a masterpiece of Roman architecture. The oratory of St Anthony and the square bell tower date from 902. The eastern and western parts of the nave were rebuilt in the twelfth and thirteenth centuries. The apse was enlarged in 1720. The tower is now covered in glazed tiles.
 Church of St Martin (12th century)
 The Washhouse (19th century)
 Museum and Park Noisot

See also
 Route des Grands Crus
 Côte de Nuits

References

Communes of Côte-d'Or
Côte-d'Or communes articles needing translation from French Wikipedia